CLSM can refer to:

Confocal laser scanning microscopy, a technique for obtaining high-resolution optical images
Controlled low strength material, a construction material